Off the Record is the second solo studio album by German musician and composer Karl Bartos (formerly of Kraftwerk). It was released on 15 March 2013, through Bureau B Records. It is Bartos' first solo album in ten years, though much of the material on Off the Record predates that on 2003's Communication.

Singles
"Atomium" was released as a single on 1 February 2013.

"Without a Trace of Emotion" was released as a promo-single on 18 March 2013.

Track listing

Notes
 "Musica Ex Machina" is based on a composition which had previously been adapted into "Imitation of Life" by Electronic.
 "Silence" consists of 6 seconds of ambient studio noise.

Charts

Weekly charts

References

2013 albums
Karl Bartos albums
Bureau B albums
German-language albums
Synth-pop albums by German artists